Polymake is software for the algorithmic treatment of convex polyhedra.

Albeit primarily a tool to study the combinatorics and the geometry of convex polytopes and polyhedra, it is by now also capable of dealing with simplicial complexes, matroids, polyhedral fans, graphs, tropical objects, toric varieties and other objects.

Polymake has been cited in over 100 recent articles indexed by Zentralblatt MATH as can be seen from its entry in the swMATH database.

Special Features

modular 
Polymake was originally designed as a research tool for studying aspects of polytopes. As such, polymake uses many  third party software packages for specialized computations, thereby providing a common interface and bridge between different tools. A user can easily (and unknowingly) switch between using different software packages in the process of computing properties of a polytope.

rule based computation 
Polymake internally uses a server-client model where the server holds information about each object (e.g., a polytope) and the clients sends requests to compute properties. The server has the job of determining how to complete each request from information already known about each object using a rule based system. For example, there are many rules on how to compute the facets of a polytope. Facets can be computed from a vertex description of the polytope, and from a (possibly redundant) inequality description. Polymake builds a dependency graph outlining the steps to process each request and selects the best path via a Dijkstra type algorithm.

scripting 
Polymake can be used within a perl script. Moreover, users can extend polymake and define new objects, properties, rules for computing properties, and algorithms.

Polymake applications 
Polymake divides its collection of functions and objects into 10 different groups called applications. They behave like C++ namespaces. The polytope application was the first one developed and it is the largest.

Common application 
This application contains many "helper" functions used in other applications.

Fan application 
The Fan application contains functions for polyhedral complexes (which generalize simplicial complexes), planar drawings of 3-polytopes, polyhedral fans, and subdivisions of points or vectors.

Fulton application 
This application deals with normal toric varieties. The name of this application is from the book "Introduction to Toric Varieties" by William Fulton.

Graph application 
The graph application is for manipulating directed and undirected graphs. Some the standard graph functions exist (like for adjacency and cliques) together with combinatorial functions like computing the lattice represented by a directed acyclic graph.

Group application 
The group application focuses on finite permutation groups. Basic properties of a group can be calculated like characters and conjugacy classes. Combined with a polytope, this application can compute properties associated with a group acting on a polytope by permuting the polytope's vertices, facets, or coordinates.

Ideal application 
The ideal application computes a few properties of polynomial ideals: Gröbner basis, Hilbert polynomial, and radicals.

Matroid application 
The matroid class can compute all the standard properties of a matroid like bases and circuits. This application can also compute more advanced properties like the Tutte polynomial of a matroid and realizing the matroid with a polytope.

Polytope application 
Within the  polytope application, there are over 230 functions or calculations that can be done with a polytope. These functions range in complexity from simply calculating basic information about a polytope (e.g., number of vertices, number of facets, tests for simplicial polytopes, and converting a vertex description to an inequality description) to combinatorial or algebraic properties (e.g., H-vector, Ehrhart polynomial, Hilbert basis, and Schlegel diagrams). There are also many visualization options.

Topaz application 
The Topaz application contains all the functions relating to abstract simplicial complexes. Many advance topological calculations over simplicial complexes can be performed like  homology groups,  orientation, fundamental group. There is also a combinatorial collection of properties that can be computed like a shelling and Hasse diagrams.

Tropical application 
The tropical application contains functions for exploring tropical geometry; in particular, tropical hypersurfaces and tropical cones.

Development History 
Polymake version 1.0 first appeared in the proceedings of DMV-Seminar "Polytopes and Optimization" held in Oberwolfach, November 1997. Version 1.0 only contained the polytope application, but the system of "applications" was not yet developed. Version 2.0 was released sometime in 2003,  and version 3.0 was released in 2016.

Software packages

Used within polymake 
Below is a list of third party software packages that polymake can interface with as of version 3.0. Users are also able to write new rule files for interfacing with any software package. Note that there is some redundancy in this list (e.g., a few different packages can be used for finding the convex hull of a polytope). Because polymake uses rule files and a dependency graph for computing properties, most of these software packages are optional. However, some become necessary for specialized computations.
 4ti2: software package for algebraic, geometric and combinatorial problems on linear spaces  
 a-tint: tropical intersection theory  
 azove: enumeration of 0/1 vertices  
 cdd: double description method for converting between an inequality and vertex description of a polytope  
 Geomview: interactive 3D viewing program  
 Gfan: Gröbner fans and tropical varieties  
 GraphViz: graph visualization software 
 LattE  (Lattice point Enumeration): counting lattice points inside polytopes and integration over polytopes  
 libnormaliz: affine monoids, vector configurations, lattice polytopes, and rational cones  
 lrs: implementation of the reverse-search algorithm for the vertex enumeration problem and convex hull problems  
 nauty: automorphism groups of graphs  
 permlib:  set stabilizer and in-orbit computations  
 PORTA:  enumerate lattice points of a polytope  
 ppl:  Parma Polyhedra Library  
 qhull: Quickhull algorithm for convex hulls  
 singular: computer algebra system for polynomial computations, with special emphasis on commutative and non-commutative algebra, algebraic geometry, and singularity theory  
 sketch: for making line drawings of two- or three-dimensional solid objects  
 SplitsTree4: phylogenetic networks  
 sympol: tool to work with symmetric polyhedra  
 threejs: JavaScript library for animated 3D computer graphics  
 tikz: TeX packages for creating graphics programmatically  
 TOPCOM:  triangulations of point configurations and matroids  
 TropLi: for computing tropical linear spaces of matroids  
 tosimplex: Dual simplex algorithm implemented by Thomas Opfer  
 Vinci: volumes of polytopes

Used in conjunction with polymake 
 jupyter-polymake: allows polymake within Jupyter notebooks. 
 PolymakeInterface: package for using polymake in GAP.
 PolyViewer: GUI viewer for polymake fies.

References

Mathematical software
Polyhedra
Computational geometry